Michael Dooney is an American comic book writer and artist and toy designer best known for his works on the Teenage Mutant Ninja Turtles series. Dooney also created the comic book series Gizmo in 1986 under Mirage Studios.

References

External links

Living people
American comics artists
Mirage Studios
Year of birth missing (living people)